Modestas Stonys (born 17 January 1980) is a Lithuanian professional footballer and a goalkeeper coach who plays for an A lyga club FK Kauno Žalgiris. He plays the position of goalkeeper and is 1.88 m tall and weighs 80 kg. He is a former member of the Lithuania national football team.

External links

FC Narva Trans profile

1980 births
Living people
Lithuanian footballers
Lithuania international footballers
FBK Kaunas footballers
FK Inkaras Kaunas players
FK Kareda Kaunas players
FC Šiauliai players
FK Šilutė players
FK Atlantas players
FK Kauno Žalgiris players
FCI Levadia Tallinn players
JK Narva Trans players
A Lyga players
Meistriliiga players
Lithuanian expatriate footballers
Expatriate footballers in Estonia
Lithuanian expatriate sportspeople in Estonia
Association football goalkeepers